Funarë is a former municipality in the Elbasan County, central Albania. At the 2015 local government reform it became a subdivision of the municipality Elbasan. The population at the 2011 census was 2,122. The municipal unit consists of the villages Bixelle, Branesh, Precë e Sipërme, Cerruje, Korre, Mollagjesh, Krrabë e Vogël, Precë e Poshtme and Stafaj.

References

Former municipalities in Elbasan County
Administrative units of Elbasan